The 2001–02 CERH European League was the 37th edition of the CERH European League organized by CERH. Its Final Four was held on 27 and 28 April 2002 in Guimarães, Portugal.

Preliminary round

|}

First round

|}

Group stage
In each group, teams played against each other home-and-away in a home-and-away round-robin format.

The two first qualified teams advanced to the Final Four.

Group A

Group B

Final four
The Final Four was played in the Pavilhão Multiusos of Guimarães, Portugal.

Barcelona achieved its 15th title, by winning their two games after a penalty shootout.

Bracket

References

External links
 CERH website

2001 in roller hockey
2002 in roller hockey
Rink Hockey Euroleague